Nia H. Gill (born March 15, 1948) is an American Democratic Party politician, who has represented the 34th Legislative District in the New Jersey State Senate since 2002. Gill was the State Senate President pro Tempore from 2010 to 2018, succeeded by Teresa Ruiz.

Biography
Gill graduated from Montclair High School, received a B.A. in History/Political History from Upsala College and was awarded a J.D. from the Rutgers Law School. Before her legislative career, she served as a law clerk for Essex County Superior Court Judge Harry Hazelwood, Jr. and as a public defender in Essex and Passaic counties. She is an attorney with the firm of Gill & Cohen, P.C. together with former Assembly member Neil M. Cohen of the 20th Legislative District.

Before her service as State Senator, Gill served in the lower house of the New Jersey Legislature, the General Assembly, from 1994 to 2002, where she was Minority Whip from 1996 to 2001. She also served in the Assembly on the Speaker's Education Funding Task Force and on several committees including, the Assembly Democratic Senior Citizen Task Force (as Co-chair) and the Assembly Advisory Committee on the Arts, History and Humanities.

Gill became a candidate for State Senate in District 34 after some of the municipalities she had represented in the Assembly were shifted into the district. Most of the communities added to District 34, which at the time was a Republican stronghold and had been for nearly two decades prior, were heavily Democratic and contributed to Gill's landslide victory over first-time incumbent Norman M. Robertson. In the 2003 primaries, LeRoy J. Jones, Jr. was given the party line opposing Gill. Despite being outspent by Jones in the heavily Democratic district, Gill won with 55% of the vote. Senator Gill has been re-elected six times, winning elections in 2003, 2007, 2011, 2013, 2017 and 2021. Gill, along with the other 39 state senators, was required to run for her seat after two years due to the election cycle set forth in the New Jersey Constitution requiring a two-year Senate term after decennial redistricting.

She served as the Senate President Pro Tempore from 2010 to 2017.

Gill is a sponsor of the measure recently signed into law to criminalize the deprivation of civil rights by public officials, making racial profiling a state crime. She has also sponsored the New Jersey Civil Rights Act, which would give individuals a remedy whenever one person deprives another person of any rights, privileges or immunities or interferes with another's civil rights. Additionally, she sponsored a resolution to formally rescind an 1868 effort by the New Jersey Legislature to withdraw New Jersey's support for the Fourteenth Amendment to the United States Constitution and its due process and equal protection provisions.

Gill sponsored legislation that provides a $3,000 income tax deduction for certain families providing home care for an elderly relative, legislation that abolishes the death penalty in New Jersey, and has also sponsored legislation allowing PAAD recipients freedom of choice in selecting a pharmacy and prohibits the imposition of a mail order system. The Senator also sponsored legislation that establishes a central registry of domestic violence orders for use in evaluating firearm permit applications, sponsored legislation to upgrade crimes of the third degree. In addition, Senator Gill is the first African American and the first woman in the history of New Jersey named to serve on the powerful Senate Judiciary Committee.

Gill is generally recognized as being one of the leading abortion rights advocates in New Jersey politics.  One significant example is her opposition to the override of then-Governor Christie Whitman's veto of the New Jersey Partial-Birth Abortion Ban Act of 1997 in the New Jersey Assembly.

Senatorial courtesy
On June 4, 2007, Governor Corzine announced and filed his intent to nominate Stuart Rabner to be the next Chief Justice of the New Jersey Supreme Court, replacing James R. Zazzali, who was nearing mandatory retirement age. Prior to the formal nomination, two members of the New Jersey Senate from Essex County, where Rabner resides, were said to be blocking consideration of his confirmation by invoking "senatorial courtesy", a Senate tradition that allows home county legislators to intercede to prevent consideration of a local nominee. On June 14, 2007, Governor Corzine officially nominated Rabner for the post. State Senator Ronald Rice withdrew his objections to Rabner's nomination on June 15, 2007, after a meeting with the governor. Fellow Senator Gill dropped her efforts to block Rabner's confirmation on June 19, 2007, after meeting with Rabner. While she did not respond to initial media requests to explain the nature of her concerns, anonymous lawmakers cited in The New York Times indicated that the objection was due to Rabner's lack of bench experience and Governor Corzine's failure to consider a minority candidate for the post.

At the conclusion of confirmation hearings, the Senate voted on June 21, 2007, to confirm Rabner as Chief Justice by a 36-1 margin, with Gill casting the lone dissenting vote, citing Rabner's lack of judicial experience and the fact that he had never argued a case in New Jersey's courts. Anne Milgram was confirmed by a 37-1 Senate vote to succeed Rabner as Attorney General.

Committees 
Committee assignments for the current session are:
Legislative Oversight
Law and Public Safety
Transportation

District 34 
Each of the 40 districts in the New Jersey Legislature has one representative in the New Jersey Senate and two members in the New Jersey General Assembly. The representatives from the 34th District for the 2022—23 Legislative Session are:
 Senator Nia Gill  (D)
 Assemblyman Thomas P. Giblin  (D)
 Assemblywoman Britnee Timberlake  (D)

Other offices sought
New Jersey Governor-elect Jon Corzine said on November 11, 2005, that he would consider appointing Gill to fill his vacant seat in the United States Senate following his resignation to become Governor of New Jersey. He later chose Bob Menendez to fill the seat.

Also competing for that nomination were Dennis R. Flynn of Glen Ridge, Newark Councilmen Donald Payne Jr. (son of the congressman), Ronald C. Rice (son of State Senator Ronald Rice), Irvington Mayor Wayne Smith, and Cathy Wright of Newark. Payne won in a landslide, garnering 60% of the vote. Rice received 19%, Gill came in third with 17% and the other three candidates split the remaining 5% of the vote.

Election history

References

External links
Senator Gill's legislative web page, New Jersey Legislature
Senator Gill's Website
New Jersey Senate Democrats Website Biography
Senator Nia H. Gill, Project Vote Smart
New Jersey Legislature financial disclosure forms - 2016 2015 2014 2013 2012 2011 2010 2009 2008 2007 2006 2005 2004

1948 births
Living people
Upsala College alumni
African-American state legislators in New Jersey
African-American women in politics
Montclair High School (New Jersey) alumni
Democratic Party members of the New Jersey General Assembly
New Jersey lawyers
Democratic Party New Jersey state senators
People from Glen Ridge, New Jersey
People from Montclair, New Jersey
Politicians from Essex County, New Jersey
Women state legislators in New Jersey
21st-century American politicians
21st-century American women politicians
21st-century African-American women
21st-century African-American politicians
20th-century African-American people
20th-century African-American women